Rebel with a Cause may refer to:

 Rebel with a Cause (Hercules: The Legendary Journeys)
 Rebel with a Cause (album), a 2014 album by Ghetts